Pyang Zhuang, or Fuping Zhuang, is an underdescribed Central Tai language spoken in southwestern Guangxi, China. It appears to be most closely related to Nong Zhuang.

The Pyang refer to themselves as B2 or C1-A, but are referred to as C1 by the surrounding Yang Zhuang people (Liao 2016:315).

Distribution
Pyang Zhuang is spoken in the following locations of Guangxi, China (Liao 2016:315-316).
Fuping Village 扶平村, Jingde Town 敬德镇, Debao County, Guangxi
Tuoxin 驮信村 ( in Pyang Zhuang)
Ronghua Township 荣华乡, Debao County, Guangxi
Kuixu Township 魁圩乡, Jingxi County, Guangxi

Classification
Pyang Zhuang may be closely related to the Nong Zhuang language of Yunnan. Innovations shared between Pyang Zhuang and Nong Zhuang include the following (Liao 2016:316).

Proto-Tai *kr- > tɕʰ- (as opposed to *kr- > kʰj- in Yang Zhuang, and *kr- > h- in Southwestern Tai). Examples include tɕʰaːA1-A 'to seek' and tɕʰɔkDS1-A 'six'.
hɔkDS1-A 'to do' is only found in Pyang Zhuang and Nong Zhuang (as opposed to hatDS1-A 'to do' in Yang Zhuang, and hetDS1-A 'to do' in Zuojiang Zhuang and Isan).

References

Liao Hanbo. 2016. Tonal development of Tai languages. M.A. dissertation. Chiang Mai: Payap University.

Tai languages